The Origin of Violence (French title:  L'Origine de la violence) is a 2016 Franco-German drama film directed by Élie Chouraqui, based on the Prix Renaudot-winning novel of the same name by Fabrice Humbert. The film won the Best Narrative Audience Award at the Philadelphia Jewish Film Festival 36.

Cast 

 Stanley Weber as Nathan Wagner in 2014
 César Chouraqui as David Nathan Wagner in 1937 / Adrien Fabre in 1962
 Richard Berry as Adrien Fabre in 2014
 Miriam Stein as Gabi in 2014
 Catherine Samie as Clémentine Fabre in 2014
 Michel Bouquet as Marcel Fabre in 2014
 Romaine Cochet as Virginie in 1937
 Christine Citti as Marguerite Fabre in 1937
 Didier Bezace as The Father in 1937
 Jean Sorel as Charles Wagner in 2014
 Joseph Joffo as Kolb in 2014
 David Kammenos as Kolb in 1941
 Martin Peillon as Charles Wagner in 1937
 Gabriel Washer as Marcel Fabre in 1937
 Jeanne Cremer as Clémentine Fabre in 1937
 Lars Eidinger as Dr. Erich Wagner
 Nikola Kastner as Ilse Koch
 Matthias Gall as Karl Koch
 Vladislav Grakovskiy as Heinrich Himmler
 Christopher Reinhard as Martin Sommer
 Tino Ranacher as Deportee

References

External links 
 

2016 films
2016 drama films
2010s French-language films
2010s German-language films
French drama films
German drama films
Films based on French novels
Drama films based on actual events
Films directed by Élie Chouraqui
2010s French films
2010s German films